The Bel Air Police Department (BAPD) is a full-service agency servicing the incorporated Municipality of Bel Air, Maryland. The department is located in the Harford county seat of Bel Air at 39 North Hickory Avenue, Bel Air, Maryland 21014.  BAPD is Bel Air's primary law enforcement agency which was established in 1874.

Chief
Charles A. Moore  Overseeing the department is Charles Moore, lifelong Harford County resident and former Maryland State Police captain.[7]

Divisions
The department consists of the following Divisions & Specialized Units:

 Patrol
 Criminal Investigations Division
 Narcotics Task Force*
 K-9
 SWAT*
 Training Division
 Community / School Policing
 Honor Guard
 Communications
 Records
 Parking Enforcement
 Cadet Program
 Auxiliary Unit
 Explorer Post #9010

*The Narcotics Task Force & SWAT Team are both multi-jurisdictional and composed of members from the Bel Air Police Department and other local police agencies.

Fleet

The Bel Air Police Department utilizes a patrol fleet of Chevrolet Impalas, Chevy Trailblazers and Chevy Tahoes.  Motorcycle: Harley Davidson Electra Glide.  Incident Command Vehicle: Ford E350.

In the fall of 2012, the Bel Air Police Department began purchasing Ford Police Interceptors which are now built with the Taurus chassis and body.  With the new vehicles, BAPD also changed the color scheme to black with white lettering, different from the traditional white with green stripes.

See picture.

Rank structure and insignia
To promote within the department, members must perform a written exam and an oral board.  Based on scores in both categories, a member will be selected for the open position.  The process is similar for lateral positions, i.e. Detective, Community Police Officer, K-9 Handler, etc. Below are sworn personnel ranks used by the Bel Air Police Department.  The rank insignia are worn on the collar, or the sleeve just below the department patch. Although not currently in use, the department also recognizes the lieutenant rank.

Website
The official site of the BAPD: www.belairmd.org/departments/police.asp

References

External links

Bel Air, Harford County, Maryland
Municipal police departments of Maryland
1874 establishments in Maryland